Scopula andresi is a moth of the family Geometridae. It was described by Max Wilhelm Karl Draudt in 1912. It is endemic to Egypt.

References

Endemic fauna of Egypt
Moths of Africa
Moths described in 1912
andresi
Taxa named by Max Wilhelm Karl Draudt